Washington Township is a township in Dade County, in the U.S. state of Missouri.

Washington Township has the name of President George Washington.

References

Townships in Missouri
Townships in Dade County, Missouri